Mark Nicholas Wrench (born 27 September 1969) is an English former footballer who played as a full-back. He played in the football league for Wrexham between 1988 and 1990. He also played non-league football for Northwich Victoria and Hyde United.

References

1969 births
Wrexham A.F.C. players
Northwich Victoria F.C. players
Hyde United F.C. players
Living people
Association football defenders
English Football League players
English footballers